Icon is a studio album recorded and released by Asia band members John Wetton and Geoffrey Downes in 2005. It is the first in the Icon series (though they previously released the album Wetton Downes in 2002, a collection of demos from the 1980s).

See also Icon II: Rubicon (2006). The third Icon album is Icon 3 (2009).  All three were reissued in 2018 by Epicon Records, a vanity label for Icon albums set up by Wetton's estate and Downes.

Track listing
"Paradox/Let Me Go" - 6:28
"God Walks with Us" – 4:40
"I Stand Alone" – 6:08
"Meet Me at Midnight" – 2:34
"Hey Josephine" – 4:52
"Far Away" – 4:04
"Please Change Your Mind" – 4:46
"Sleep Angel" – 4:12
"Spread Your Wings" – 3:46
"In the End" (featuring Annie Haslam) – 4:47

Bonus tracks
"There in Your Bed" – 2:24
"The Smile Has Left Your Eyes '05" – 3:42
"Heat of the Moment '05" – 4:38

An Icon EP was also released (on Frontiers Records), featuring selected tracks from the album, with some being remixes with orchestrations by Mike Stobbie (indicated by * below)

EP Tracklist

"Heat of the Moment '05" – 4:38
"Overture/Paradox"*
"Let Me Go"*
"The Smile Has Left Your Eyes '05" – 3:42
"In the End" (featuring Annie Haslam) – 4:47*
"There in Your Bed" – 2:24

Personnel
 Geoffrey Downes – keyboards, vocoder, producer
 John Mitchell – guitars
 John Wetton – vocals, basses, classical and acoustic guitars, producer
 Steve Christey – drums
 Hugh McDowell – cello
 Rob Aubrey – engineer, mixing, mastering

References

External links 
 Album lyrics

2005 albums
John Wetton albums
Albums produced by Geoff Downes
Frontiers Records albums